Events from the year 1943 in Ireland.

Incumbents
 President: Douglas Hyde
 Taoiseach: Éamon de Valera (FF)

Events
February – Erwin Schrödinger delivers the series of public lectures later published as What Is Life? under the auspices of the Dublin Institute for Advanced Studies at Trinity College.
1 February – the Currency Commission is renamed the Central Bank of Ireland (under terms of the Central Bank Act 1942); it is not, however, given all the powers expected of a central bank.
23 February – S.S. Kyleclare torpedoed in North Atlantic by  : eighteen die.
23–24 February – Cavan Orphanage Fire: thirty-five girls and a cook from St Joseph's Orphanage, an industrial school in Cavan, are killed in a fire in their dormitories. A subsequent inquiry absolves the Poor Clares of blame.
17 March
Éamon de Valera and his government celebrate St. Patrick's Day with a céilí in the Great Hall of Dublin Castle. de Valera makes the speech "The Ireland That We Dreamed Of", commonly called the "comely maidens" speech.
British military aircraft crashes at Templeport, Tullyhaw, County Cavan: pilot and navigator survive.
April – 8 republicans interned at Curragh Camp begin a hunger strike for release.
1 May – Sir Basil Brooke becomes Prime Minister of Northern Ireland.
15 May – Irish Oak (Irish Shipping) torpedoed and sunk by U-607, 700 miles west of Ireland: crew rescued by Irish Plane eight hours later.
2 June – S.S. City of Bremen (Saorstat & Continental Steam Ship Company) bombed by a Junkers 88 and sunk in the Bay of Biscay: all eleven crew rescued by a Spanish fishing trawler.
23 June – 1943 Irish general election: Fianna Fáil under Éamon de Valera remain in power, but lose their parliamentary majority. Electoral gains are made by the Labour Party and Clann na Talmhan, the national agricultural party. Members of the 11th Dáil assemble on 1 July. 
5 October – in the largest manufacturing campaign in the history of the Irish Sugar Company, seven hundred employees at the Carlow Sugar Beet Factory will work in three shifts without pause for 18 weeks until all the 230,000 acres (930 km2) of beet is processed.
29 December –  (with a crew of 11) rescues 164 Germans from the Bay of Biscay.
Winter – Irish coffee first served, at Foynes.

Arts and literature
26 April – M. J. Molloy's first play, the comedy Old Road, is premiered at the Abbey Theatre, Dublin.
25 May – Christine Longford's historical play Patrick Sarsfield is premiered at the Gate Theatre, Dublin.
The Irish Exhibition of Living Art is founded.
The National Film Institute, a predecessor of the Irish Film Institute, is founded under the influence of the Catholic Church to counter perceived moral corruption in imported films.
Cecil Day-Lewis publishes his poetry Word Over All.
Mary Lavin publishes her first book, Tales from Bective Bridge, ten short stories about life in rural Ireland, which wins the James Tait Black Memorial Prize for fiction.
Kate O'Brien publishes her novel The Last of Summer.
Cathal Ó Sándair publishes his first novels, An t-eiteallán do-fheicthe and Triocha písa airgid.

Sport

Football

League of Ireland
Winners: Cork United
FAI Cup
Winners: Drumcondra 2–1 Cork United.

Golf
Irish Open is not played due to The Emergency.

Births
17 January – Thomas John Curry, Auxiliary Bishop of the Roman Catholic Archdiocese of Los Angeles.
27 January – Seán Ryan, Labour Party (Ireland) TD, Seanad Éireann member.
30 January – Pat Henderson, Kilkenny hurler and manager.
9 February – Pat Dunne, soccer player (died 2015).
7 April – Francis O'Brien, Fianna Fáil Senator.
10 April – Patrick Hughes, cricketer.
1 May – Joe Walsh, Fianna Fáil TD and Cabinet Minister.
7 May – Donal McCann, actor (died 1999).
10 May – John L. Murray, Chief Justice of Ireland.
21 May – Michael Noonan, Fine Gael TD for Limerick East and Cabinet Minister.
14 June – Maurice Manning, Fine Gael politician.
22 September – Robert Ballagh, painter and designer.
30 September – Ray Burke, Fianna Fáil TD and Cabinet Minister convicted and jailed on charges arising from corruption in office.
September – Hugh Byrne, Fianna Fáil TD.
30 November – Louis Belton, Fine Gael TD.
December – Mick Roche, Tipperary hurler (died 2016).
Full date unknown
Paul Carney, criminal lawyer, presiding judge of the High Court (died 2015).
Tony Felloni, heroin dealer
Eoghan Harris, journalist and Senator.

Deaths
10 January – Jamesy Kelleher, Cork hurler (born 1878).
28 January – Hugo Flinn, Fianna Fáil TD (born 1879).
29 January – Geoffrey Taylour, 4th Marquess of Headfort, peer (born 1878).
22 February – Wentworth Allen, cricketer (born 1894).
20 May – P. J. Brady, Irish Nationalist Member of UK Parliament for Dublin St Stephen's Green (born 1868).
11 June – Thomas O'Donnell, barrister, judge, Irish Nationalist, MP (born 1871).
19 July – Robert Alexander, sportsman (born 1910).
27 July – William Cummins, national teacher, member of Seanad (1922–1943).
7 August – Sarah Purser, painter and stained-glass maker (born 1848).
27 September – Willoughby Hamilton, tennis player, Wimbledon Champion in 1890 (born 1864).
28 September – Moya Llewelyn Davies, Republican activist and Gaelic scholar (born 1881).
20 November – P. T. Daly, trade unionist (born 1870).
31 December – John Mahony, Kerry hurler (born 1863).

References

 
1940s in Ireland
Ireland
Independent Ireland in World War II
Years of the 20th century in Ireland